Qutbism is an Islamist ideology which was developed by Sayyid Qutb, a leading member of the Muslim Brotherhood who was executed by the Egyptian government in 1966. It has been described as advancing the extremist, jihadist ideology of propagating "offensive jihad" – waging jihad in conquest – "armed jihad in the advance of Islam", and simply "Islamic-based terrorism".

Sayyid Qutb could be said to have founded the actual movement of radical Islam. Qutbism has gained widespread attention due to its influence on militant Islamic extremists and terrorists, most notably Osama bin Laden and Ayman al-Zawahiri of al-Qaeda, as well as the Salafi-jihadi terrorist group ISIL/ISIS/IS/Daesh. Muslim extremists "cite Sayyid Qutb repeatedly and consider themselves his intellectual descendants". Qutbist literature have become a primary source of influence for numerous Jihadist organisations that emerged since the 1970s such as the Egyptian Islamic Jihad, Jama'ah al-Islamiyya, al-Takfir wal Hijra, Armed Islamic Group of Algeria (GIA),  LIFG, Al-Qaeda, Al-Nusra Front, Islamic State, etc. that seek to implement their vision of armed Jihad.

Terminology
While referred to as Qutbists or Qutbiyyun (singular: Qutbi), this group of Muslims rarely call themselves by these names (i.e. the word is not an endonym); the name originated from and is used by the sect's opponents (i.e. it is an  exonym).

Tenets

The main tenet of the Qutbist ideology is that the Muslim community doesn't follow the "true Islam", which "has been extinct for a few centuries". Contemporary Muslims having reverted to Godless ignorance (jahiliyya) Islam  must be re-established by Qutb's followers.

Qutb outlined his religious and political ideas in his book Ma'alim fi-l-Tariq (aka Milestones). Important principles of Qutbism include:
 Adherence to Sharia as sacred law accessible to humans, without which Islam cannot exist
 Adherence to Sharia as a complete way of life that will bring not only justice, but peace, personal serenity, scientific discovery, complete freedom from servitude, and other benefits;
 Avoidance of Western and non-Islamic "evil and corruption," including socialism, nationalism and consumerist capitalism. Western ways have nothing to offer Muslims.
 Vigilance against Western and Jewish conspiracies against Islam;
 A two-pronged attack of
preaching to convert and,
jihad to forcibly eliminate the "structures" of Jahiliyya;
 The importance of offensive Jihad to eliminate Jahiliyya not only from the Islamic homeland but from the face of the Earth, because "truth and falsehood cannot coexist on this earth".

Takfirism
The most controversial aspect of Qutbism is takfir, whereby Qutb has declared Islam "extinct," so that those who call themselves Muslims — with the exception of Qutb's Islamic vanguard — are not actually Muslim. Takfir was intended to shock Muslims into religious re-armament. When taken literally, takfir also had the effect of causing non-Qutbists who claimed to be Muslim to be in violation of Sharia law. Violating this law could potentially be considered apostasy from Islam: a crime punishable by death according to Islamic law.

Because of these serious consequences, Muslims have traditionally been reluctant to practice takfir, that is, to pronounce professed Muslims as unbelievers (even Muslims in violation of Islamic law). This prospect of fitna, or internal strife, between Qutbists and "takfir-ed" mainstream Muslims, was put to Qutb by prosecutors in the trial that led to his execution, and is still made by his Muslim detractors.

Qutb died before he could clear up the issue of whether jahiliyyah referred to the whole "Muslim world," or to only Muslim governments but a serious campaign of terror – or "physical power and jihad" against "the organizations and authorities" of "jahili" Egypt – was promulgated in the 1980s and 1990s by insurgents that observers believed to be influenced by Qutb.  Victims included Egyptian President Anwar Sadat, head of the counter-terrorism police Major General Raouf Khayrat, parliamentary speaker Rifaat el-Mahgoub, dozens of European tourists and Egyptian bystanders, and over one hundred Egyptian police officers.  Other factors (such as economic dislocation/stagnation and rage over President Sadat's policy of reconciliation with Israel) played a part in instigating the violence, but Qutb's takfir against jahiliyyah (or jahili) society, and his passionate belief that jahiliyyah government was irredeemably evil, played a key role.

History

Spread of Qutb's ideas
Qutb's message was spread through his writing, his followers and especially through his brother, Muhammad Qutb, who moved to Saudi Arabia following his release from prison in Egypt and became a professor of Islamic Studies and edited, published and promoted his brother Sayyid's work.

Ayman Al-Zawahiri, who went on to become a member of the Egyptian Islamic Jihad, was one of Muhammad Qutb's students and later a mentor of Osama bin Laden and a leading member of al-Qaeda. He had been first introduced to Sayyad Qutb by his uncle, Mafouz Azzam, who had been very close to Sayyad Qutb throughout his life and impressed on al-Zawahiri "the purity of Qutb's character and the torment he had endured in prison." Zawahiri paid homage to Qutb in his work Knights under the Prophet's Banner.

Qutbism was considered propagated by Abdullah Azzam during the war between the Soviet and Afghan mujahideens. As the Muslim jihad volunteers from around the world exchanged religious ideas, Qutbism  merged with Salafism and Wahhabism, culminating in the formation of Salafi jihadism. Abdullah Azzam was a mentor of bin Laden as well.

Osama bin Laden is reported to have regularly attended weekly public lectures by Muhammad Qutb at King Abdulaziz University, and to have read and been deeply influenced by Sayyid Qutb.

Late Yemeni Al Qaeda leader Anwar al-Awlaki has also spoken of Qutb's great influence and of being "so immersed with the author I would feel Sayyid was with me... speaking to me directly.”

Backlash
Following Qutb's death Qutbist ideas spread throughout Egypt and other parts of the Arab and Muslim world, prompting a backlash by more traditionalist and conservative Muslims, such as the book Du'ah, la Qudah (Preachers, not Judges) (1969). The book, written by MB Supreme Guide Hassan al-Hudaybi, attacked the idea of Takfir of other Muslims (but was ostensibly targeted not at Qutb but at Mawdudi, as al-Hudaybi had been a friend and supporter of Qutb).

Views

Science and learning
On the importance of science and learning, the key to the power of his bête noire, western civilization, Qutb was ambivalent. He wrote that
Muslims have drifted away from their religion and their way of life, and have forgotten that Islam appointed them as representatives of God and made them responsible for learning all the sciences and developing various capabilities to fulfill this high position which God has granted them.

... and encouraged Muslims to seek knowledge.

A Muslim can go to a Muslim or to a non-Muslim to learn abstract sciences such as chemistry, physics, biology, astronomy, medicine, industry, agriculture, administration (limited to its technical aspects), technology, military arts and similar sciences and arts; although the fundamental principle is that when the Muslim community comes into existence it should provide experts in all these fields in abundance, as all these sciences and arts are a sufficient obligation (Fard al-Kifayah) on Muslims (that is to say, there ought to be a sufficient number of people who specialize in these various sciences and arts to satisfy the needs of the community).

On the other hand, Qutb believed some learning was forbidden to Muslims and should not be studied, including:

principles of economics and political affairs and interpretation of historical processes... origin of the universe, the origin of the life of man... philosophy, comparative religion... sociology (excluding statistics and observations)... Darwinist biology ([which] goes beyond the scope of its observations, without any rhyme or reason and only for the sake of expressing an opinion...).

and that the era of scientific discovery (that non-Muslim Westerners were so famous for) was now over:

The period of resurgence of science has also come to an end. This period, which began with the Renaissance in the sixteenth century after Christ and reached its zenith in the eighteenth and nineteenth centuries, does not possess a reviving spirit.

However important scientific discovery was, or is, an important tool to achieve it (and to do everything else) is to follow Sharia law under which

blessings fall on all mankind, [and] leads in an easy manner to the knowledge of the secrets of nature, its hidden forces and the treasures concealed in the expanses of the universe.

On Philosophy and Kalam 

Sayyid Qutb was also deeply opposed to Falsafa and 'Ilm al-Kalam (speculative theology) which he denounced as deviations based on Aristotlean logic and undermined pristine Islamic creed of the early generations. He denounced these disciplines as alien to Islamic traditions; and called for its abandonment in favour of literalist recourse to Scriptures.

Sharia and governance
Qutbism maintains that in a sharia-based society, wonders of justice, prosperity, peace and harmony—both individually and societally—are  "not postponed for the next life [i.e. heaven] but are operative even in this world".

The harmony and perfection is such that the use of offensive jihad to spread sharia-Islam  throughout the non-Muslim world will not be aggression but "a movement... to introduce true freedom to mankind." Mankind is freed from servitude to other men because the divine nature of Sharia means no human authorities are necessary to judge or enforce its law. But in other works Qutb does describe the ruler of the Islamic state, as a man (never a woman) who "derives his legitimacy from his being elected by the community and from his submission to God. He has no privileges over other Muslims, and is only obeyed as long as he himself adheres to the shari‘a".

Conspiracy
Qutbism emphasizes what it sees as evil designs of Westerners and Jews against Islam, and the importance of Muslims not trusting or imitating them.

Non-Muslims
Other elements of Qutbism deal with non-Muslims, particularly Westerners, and have drawn attention and controversy from their subjects, particularly after the September 11, 2001 attacks. Though their terminology, issues and arguments are different from those of the Islamic traditionalists, Westerners also have criticisms to make.

One scholar (A. B. Soage) quotes Qutb expressing his "extremely negative image" of non-Muslims:

"The people of the Book [Christians and Jews] were hostile to Muslims at the time of the prophet – Peace be Upon Him – and are hostile to the vanguard of Islamic renaissance [jihadi movement Qutb hoped to inspire] now simply because they are Muslims who believe in God  [and] in what was revealed to them in the Qur’an. […] They oppose the Muslims simply for being Muslims, and [also] because they are depraved and have falsified [the books] that God revealed to them.

Qutb believed (like medieval author Ibn Qayyim al-Jawziyya) the realm outside of Muslim lands was "Dar al-Harb (the Abode of War)", and had to be subjugated by Muslims. Subjugation would actually be "liberation" however, because it "would free men from all authority except that of God",  but at the same time, the liberated non-Muslim would "not be free to ‘deify their caprices’ (hawa-hum) or choose to be the servants of [other] servants’, i.e. in the words of A.B. Soage, "they would not be allowed to legislate for themselves or choose representatives to do it for them. Obeying the social, moral, economic and international norms of the Islamist state would be non-negotiable." (How/why non-Muslims would obey the laws of a religion they do not believe in without authorities to compel them is not explained.)

The West
In Qutb's view, for example, Western Imperialism is not, as Westerner anti-imperialists or anti-racists would have Muslims believe, only an economic  or racial exploitation of weak peoples by the strong and greedy. Nor were the medieval Crusades, as some historians claim, merely an attempt by Christians to reconquer the formerly Christian-ruled, Christian holy land. These are deceptions created "so that the Believers become confused concerning the true nature of the struggle", and their faith weakens.

Both were different expressions of the West's "pronounced... enmity" towards Islam, including plans to "demolish the structure of Muslim society." Imperialism is "a mask for the crusading spirit."

Qutb spent two years in the U.S. in the late 1940s and disliked it immensely. Examples of Western malevolence Qutb personally experienced and related to his readers include an attempt by a "drunken, semi-naked... American agent" to seduce him on his voyage to America, and the (alleged) celebration of American hospital employees upon hearing of the assassination of Egyptian Ikhwan Supreme Guide Hassan al-Banna.

Qutb's Western critics have questioned whether Qutb was likely to arouse interest of American intelligence agents (as he was not a member of the Egyptian government or any political organization at that time), or whether many Americans, let alone hospital employees, knew who Hassan al-Banna or the Muslim Brotherhood were in 1948.

Western corruption

Qutbism emphasizes a claimed Islamic moral superiority over the West, according to Islamist values. One example of "the filth" and "rubbish heap of the West"  was the "animal-like" "mixing of the sexes."  The "primitive" Jazz music "that the Negroes invented to satisfy their primitive inclinations". Qutb states that while he was in America a young woman told him

Critics (such as Maajid Nawaz) protest that Qutb's complaint about both American racism and the "primitive inclinations" of the "Negro" are contradictory and hypocritical. There is also doubt as to whether the sentiment that "sexual relations" has no "ethical element" would have been representative of American public opinion at the height of the sexual revolution 30 years later, let alone at the time of Qutb's visit to America in the late 1940s.
The place Qutb spent most of his time in was the small city of Greeley, Colorado, dominated by cattle feedlots and an "unpretentious university", originally founded as "a sober, godly, cooperative community".

Jews

The other anti-Islamic conspiratorial group, according to Qutb, is "World Jewry," because (he believes)  it is engaging in tricks in order to eliminate "faith and religion", and (he also believes)  it is trying to divert "the wealth of mankind" into "Jewish financial institutions" by charging interest on loans.  Jewish designs are so pernicious, according to Qutb's logic, that "anyone who leads this [Islamic] community away from its religion and its Quran can only be [a] Jewish agent", causing one critic to claim that the statement apparently means that "any source of division, anyone who undermines the relationship between Muslims and their faith is by definition a Jew".

Criticism

By Muslims

While Ma'alim fi-l-Tariq [Arabic: معالم في الطريق] (Milestones) was Qutb's manifesto, other elements of Qutbism are found in his works Al-'adala al-Ijtima'iyya fi-l-Islam [Arabic: العدالة الاجتماعية في الاسلام] (Social Justice in Islam), and his Quranic commentary Fi Zilal al-Qur'an [Arabic: في ظلال القرآن] (In the shade of the Qur'an). Ideas in (or alleged to be in) those works also have come under attack from (at least some) traditionalist/conservative Muslims. They include:
 Qutb's assertion that slavery was now illegal under Islam, as its lawfulness was only temporary, existing only "until the world devised a new code of practice, other than enslavement." Many contemporary Islamic scholars, however, do share the view that slavery is not allowed in Islam in modern times. On the other hand, according to Salafi critics such as Saleh Al-Fawzan, "Islam has affirmed slavery ... And it will continue so long as Jihaad in the path of Allah exists."
 Proposals to redistribute income and property to the needy. Opponents claim they are revisionist and innovations of Islam.
 Describing Moses as having an "excitable nature" – this allegedly being "mockery," and "mockery of the Prophets is apostasy in its own,'" according to Shaikh ‘Abdul-Aziz ibn Baz.
 Dismissing fiqh or the schools of Islamic law known as madhhab as separate from "Islamic principles and Islamic understanding."
 Describing Islamic societies as being sunk in a state of Jahiliyyah (pagan ignorance) implying takfir. Salafi scholars like (Albani, Ibn Baz, Ibn Jibreen, Ibn Uthaymeen, Saalih al-Fawzan, Muqbil ibn Hadi, etc.) would condemn Qutb as a heretic for takfiri views as well as for what they considered to be theological deviancies. They also identified his methodology as a distinct "Qutbi' manhaj", thus resulting in the labelling of Salafi-Jihadis as "Qutbists" by many of their quietist Salafi opponents.

Qutb may now be facing criticism representing his idea's success or Qutbism's logical conclusion as much as his idea's failure to persuade some critics. Writing before the Islamic revival was in full bloom, Qutb sought Islamically correct alternatives to European ideas like Marxism and socialism and proposed Islamic means to achieve the ends of social justice and equality, redistribution of private property and political revolution. But according to Olivier Roy, contemporary "neofundamentalist refuse to express their views in modern terms borrowed from the West. They consider indulging in politics, even for a good cause, will by definition lead to bid'a and shirk (the giving of priority to worldly considerations over religious values.)"

There are, however, some commentators who display an ambivalence towards him, and Roy notes that "his books are found everywhere and mentioned on most neo-fundamentalist websites, and arguing his "mystical approach", "radical contempt and hatred for the West", and "pessimistic views on the modern world" have resonated with these Muslims.

Relationship with the Muslim Brotherhood
The controversy over Qutbism is partially caused by two opposing factions which exist within the Islamic revival: the politically quiet Salafi Muslims, and the politically active Muslim groups which are associated with the Muslim Brotherhood, the group Qutb was a member of for about the last decade and a half of his life.

Although Sayyid Qutb was never the head (or the "Supreme Guide") of the Muslim Brotherhood, he was the Brotherhood's "leading intellectual," <ref>Ruthvan, Malise, Islam in the World, Penguin, 1984</ref> the editor of its weekly periodical, and a member of the highest branch in the Brotherhood, the Working Committee and the Guidance Council.

Hassan al-Hudaybi, the leader of the Muslim Brotherhood, argued against takfir and adopted a tolerant attitude. In response, some Qutbists concluded that the Muslim Brotherhood had "abandoned the ideas of Sayyid Qutb". Ayman al-Zawahiri, a prominent Qutbist, also attacked the Muslim Brotherhood.

After the publication of Ma'alim fi-l-Tariq (Milestones), opinion in the Brotherhood split over his ideas, though many in Egypt (including extremists outside the Brotherhood) and most of the Muslim Brotherhood's members in other countries are said to have shared his analysis "to one degree or another." However, the leadership of the Brotherhood, headed by Hassan al-Hudaybi, remained moderate and interested in political negotiation and activism. By the 1970s, the Brotherhood had renounced violence as a means of achieving its goals. In recent years, his ideas have been embraced by Islamic extremist groups, while the Muslim Brotherhood has tended to serve as the official voice of Moderate Islamism.

Relationship with Islamic terrorism
In 2005, the British author and religion academic Karen Armstrong declared, regarding the ideological framework of al-Qaeda, that "Bin Laden was not inspired by Wahhabism but by the writings of the Egyptian ideologue Sayyid Qutb, who was executed by President Nasser in 1966. Almost every fundamentalist movement in Sunni Islam has been strongly influenced by Qutb, so there is a good case for calling the violence that some of his followers commit "Qutbian terrorism"." Some of the prominent figures of Global Jihadism who adopted the tenets of Qutbism include 'Abd al-Salam al-Faraj,  Shukri Mustafa, 'Usama Bin Laden, Muhammad Surur, Mustafa Setmariam Nasar, Ayman al-Zawahiri, Abdullah Yusuf Azzam, Abu Mus'ab al-Zarqawi, Abubakr al-Baghdadi, etc.

According to The Guardian journalist Robert Manne, "there exists a more or less general consensus that the ideology of the Islamic State was founded upon the principles set forth by Qutb", particularly based on some sections of his treatises Milestones and In the Shade of the Qur'an. However, the self-declared "Islamic State" in Iraq and Syria which was headed by Abu Bakr al-Baghdadi has been described by many other scholars as being more violent than al-Qaeda and more closely aligned with Wahhabism, alongside Salafism and Salafi jihadism. In 2014, regarding the ideology of ISIL/ISIS/IS/Daesh, Karen Armstrong remarked that "IS is certainly an Islamic movement [...] because its roots are in Wahhabism, a form of Islam practised in Saudi Arabia that developed only in the 18th century". Nabil Na'eem, a former associate of Ayman al-Zawahiri and an ex-Islamic Jihad leader, blamed Qutb's writings for being the main factor that led to the emergence of Al-Qaeda, Islamic State and other fundamentalist groups.

See also
 History of Egypt under Gamal Abdel Nasser
 History of Egypt under Anwar Sadat
 International propagation of Salafism and Wahhabism
 Islamic terrorism in the West
 Jihadism
 Wahhabism

References
Notes

Citations

Bibliography

Further reading
Berman, Paul. Terror and Liberalism.''  W. W. Norton & Company, April 2003.
Berman devotes several chapters of this work to discussing Qutb as the foundation of a unique strain of Islamist thought.

External links
Stanley, Trevor Sayyid Qutb, The Pole Star of Egyptian Salafism.
El-Kadi, Ahmed Great Muslims of the 20th Century ... Sayyid Qutb.
Who was Sayyid Qutb?
Reformer Qutb Thinks Himself Superior to Madhhab Imams.
Reformer Qutb Invites People to Stand Up and Shout Against the Dictators.
Mawdudi, Qutb and the Prophets of Allah.
The Ideology of Terrorism and Violence in Saudi Arabia: Origins, Reasons and Solution
C. Eikmeier, Dale Qutbism: An Ideology of Islamic-Fascism

Islamism
Islam and antisemitism
Salafi Jihadism
Qutbism
Jihadism
Mujahideen
Islamic fundamentalism